Liam Seán MacDaid (born 19 July 1945) is an Irish former Roman Catholic prelate who served as Bishop of Clogher between 2010 and 2016.

Early life and education
MacDaid was born on 19 July 1945 in Bundoran, County Donegal. He attended primary school at St Louis Infant School and St Macartan's National School, and secondary school at St Macartan's College. MacDaid has a keen interest in Gaelic games, playing for St Joseph's GFC at club level and some Donegal county teams in the early 1970s.

MacDaid began studying for the priesthood at St Patrick's College, Maynooth in 1962, graduating with honours in Celtic studies in 1965 and sacred theology in 1968.

He was ordained to the priesthood for the Diocese of Clogher on 15 June 1969.

Presbyteral ministry 
Following ordination, MacDaid completed a higher diploma in education from St Patrick's College, Maynooth, before returning to the Diocese of Clogher in 1970 for his first diocesan appointment, as a teacher at St Macartan's College, where he subsequently served as president between 1981 and 1989.

MacDaid subsequently completed a diploma in counselling from University College Dublin in 1978, and served as a counselling tutor with the Catholic Marriage Advisory Council, before he was appointed chairman of the diocesan council of priests in 1988.

MacDaid received his first pastoral appointment in 1989, when he was appointed curate in Aghavea/Aghintaine (centred on Brookeborough and Fivemiletown). He was appointed diocesan secretary, diocesan communications officer and administrator in Tyholland in 1993, and subsequently diocesan chancellor the following year. MacDaid was also a founding member of the Association of Management of Catholic Secondary Schools.

He was appointed Chaplain of His Holiness by Pope John Paul II on 27 February 2002.

Episcopal ministry
MacDaid was appointed Bishop-elect of Clogher by Pope Benedict XVI on 6 May 2010. At the time of his appointment, he was the most recent bishop to have been chosen from among the clergy of his native diocese.

He was consecrated by the Archbishop of Armagh and Primate of All Ireland, Seán Brady, on 25 July at St Macartan's Cathedral, Monaghan. In his first address as bishop, MacDaid referred to the recent clerical sexual abuse cases in the Church, saying that the church "has been brought to our knees but maybe that is no bad thing".

During his episcopacy, he advocated for greater collaboration between priests and laity, establishing support groups including a pastoral support group and a commission on diocesan liturgy, and initiated a stronger diocesan youth ministry. MacDaid also continued the development and implementation of safeguarding policies and structures initiated by his predecessor, Joseph Duffy, which were reviewed and complimented upon by the National Board for the Safeguarding of Children in the Catholic Church in Ireland in 2011. He also chaired the Council for Marriage and the Family of the Irish Catholic Bishops' Conference from 2012 until 2016, and served as vice-chairperson of Accord.

MacDaid joined a number of other bishops in releasing a statement on 8 June 2016, ahead of a referendum in the United Kingdom on its membership of the European Union, in warning against the impact of a potential Brexit on the peace process in Northern Ireland.

It was announced on 1 October 2016 that McDaid had tendered his resignation on medical grounds to Pope Francis some months previously, and that it had been with immediate effect.

References

External links 

 Bishop Liam Seán MacDaid on Catholic-Hierarchy.org
 Bishop Liam Seán MacDaid on GCatholic
 Bishop Liam Seán MacDaid on Diocese of Clogher

1945 births
Living people
Alumni of St Patrick's College, Maynooth
21st-century Roman Catholic bishops in Ireland
People from Bundoran
Roman Catholic bishops of Clogher
People educated at St Macartan's College, Monaghan